"The Unauthorized Rusical" is the eighth episode of the tenth season of the American reality competition television series RuPaul's Drag Race, which aired on VH1 on May 10, 2018. The episode has contestants attempt to get RuPaul to fake slap them for the mini challenge, and sing live a musical about Cher for the main challenge. Billy Eichner and Andrew Rannells serve as guest judges, alongside regular panelists RuPaul, Michelle Visage, and Carson Kressley.

Episode

Mini challenge

The seven remaining contestants are asked by RuPaul to participate in an improv mini-challenge, called "Slap Out of It", that pastiches a similar scene from the finale of season two. Each queen has to try and make RuPaul fake slap them. Asia O'Hara, who is accidentally slapped for real by RuPaul, wins the mini-challenge.

Main challenge
For the main challenge, the contestants are tasked by RuPaul to perform and sing in a live tribute act to American singer and actress Cher, titled "Cher: The Unauthorized Rusical". The contestants portray Cher from different phases of her career: Aquaria as Disco Cher, Asia O'Hara as Movie Star Cher, Eureka as Rock Star Cher, Kameron Michaels as '60s Cher, Miz Cracker as Comeback Cher, and Monét X Change and The Vixen as Variety Show Cher. The queens rehearse with Todrick Hall. The musical features Chester Lockhart, uncredited as Sonny Bono, performing alongside Kameron during the '60s Cher segment.

Runway

RuPaul introduces guest judges Billy Eichner and Andrew Rannells, and reveals the theme for the runway: "Glitterific".

On the main stage, Monét receive positive comments for her performance and mixed reviews for her runway look, conversely for both Eureka and Miz Cracker with their runway and performance; all three contestants are deemed safe. Kameron receives praise for both her runway look and Cher performance, and wins the main challenge. Aquaria, Asia and The Vixen are complimented for their runway looks, but their performances place them in the bottom three. Aquaria is declared safe, while Asia and The Vixen lip sync to "Groove Is In the Heart" by Deee-Lite.

Asia wins the lip sync and The Vixen is eliminated from the competition.

Results

Reception
Oliver Sava of The A.V. Club said "Slap Out Of It" "might be the best Drag Race mini-challenge ever". Yahoo! Entertainment's Lyndsey Parker said the musical "needs to go straight to Broadway and win all the Tonys. I could watch 'Cher: The Rusical' over and over, and I'd never want to snap out of it."

Amanda Duarte of The New York Times wrote, "The Rusical should have been unauthorized by the producers of this program. The off-Cher (Sherm?) songs, the fact that none of the terrified, dead-eyed queens had ever done a Cher impression before, and the insane final number in which they attempted the Watusi in front of a bunch of glittery foamcore cockroaches added up to the kind of triple threat that warrants a restraining order. The whole thing was (TW: Cher puns) half-bred. I wanted to “Silkwood”-shower it off me. I wished I could turn back time. I cannot remember a worse challenge in the herstory of this show. I was moan-struck."

See also 

 List of Rusicals

References

External links
  (May 13, 2018), VH1
 Cher: The Unauthorized Rusical at IMDb

2018 American television episodes
American LGBT-related television episodes
Cher
RuPaul's Drag Race episodes